Juw may refer to:
 Juw Dekama (1449/1450–1523), Frisian chieftain
 Juw Juwinga (died 1396), Frisian chieftain
 Jinnah University for Women, in Karachi, Pakistan
 Wãpha language